Environmental Lands Acquisition and Protection Program abbreviated as ELAPP is a taxpayer funded land acquisition and conservation strategy in Hillsborough County, Florida. The program began in January 1987 when the Hillsborough County Commissioners approved ordinance with $21 million in acquisition funding over four years. In 1990 voters approved a 20-year bond issuance for additional land purchases. Again in November 2008 another bond program was approved by voters for up to $200 million. In the 20 years up to 2008, more than 50 land purchases had been made including several in the Hillsborough River watershed. Approximately $200 million had been spent with an estimated 38 percent coming from outside sources.

Land acquisitions
Cypress Creek Preserve, 2,547 acres (in Pasco County)
Temple Terrace Riverfront Park, 118-acre

See also
Environmentally Endangered Lands Programs

References

Protected areas of Hillsborough County, Florida
Environmental conservation
Environment of Florida
1987 establishments in Florida

External links
ELAPP History Project
University of South Florida Libraries: Environmental Lands Acquisition Protection Program Collection Images documenting ELAPP's work in protecting over 61,000 acres of rare and important habitat in Hillsborough County, Florida.
University of South Florida Libraries: Environmental Lands Acquisition and Protection Program Oral History Project Oral histories from people who were directly involved in ELAPP's beginnings and successful growth.